Nine Entertainment (registered as Nine Entertainment Co. Pty Ltd) is an Australian publicly listed media company with holdings in radio and television broadcasting, newspaper publications and digital media. It uses Nine as its corporate branding and also prefers this usage to be used for the parent company.

The entity is largely a successor to the former Publishing and Broadcasting Limited (PBL), which was established by the Packer family. The Packers officially ended their involvement with the company in 2008 and its name was changed to Nine in 2010. The company merged with Fairfax Media in December 2018, expanding its brands and investments across television, video on demand, print, digital, radio and real estate classifieds.

Nine's assets include the Nine Network, Nine Radio; major newspaper mastheads such as The Sydney Morning Herald, The Age and The Australian Financial Review; digital properties such as nine.com.au, 9Honey, Pedestrian; video-on-demand platform Stan; and a majority investment in real estate web portal Domain Group.

History
The company was a successor of the long-established Australian media group Australian Consolidated Press (ACP), created by Sir Frank Packer, whose Channel 9 was Australia's first commercial TV network. Kerry Packer inherited the company after his father's death in 1974. ACP was combined with the Nine Network in 1994 as Publishing and Broadcasting Ltd (PBL).

PBL Media 
Under a split of PBL into two companies, after Kerry Packer's death in 2005, PBL Media, formerly held by PBL, was transferred to Consolidated Media Holdings (CMH).

PBL Media was established in October 2006, when PBL transferred its media interests, including the ACP Magazines, Nine Network, and ninemsn, to the new business - a joint venture between PBL and CVC Asia Pacific. The recapitalisation was announced on 18 October 2006.

In June 2007, PBL announced that it would sell a further 25% to CVC Capital Partners for $515 million. In September 2007, it was announced that the transaction was to go ahead at the increased purchase price of approximately $526 million.

On 27 October 2008, James Packer and CMH representatives, such as Alexander, resigned from the board of PBL Media, effectively ending financial backing and future associations with the company.  James Packer later sold his media interests.

Nine Entertainment 
From 2 December 2010, PBL Media rebranded as Nine Entertainment Company In December 2011 former McDonald's Australia chief executive Peter Bush was appointed chairman following the resignation of Tim Parker. In February 2013 David Haslingden, previously President and Chief Operating Officer of Fox Networks Group, was appointed to the Board as an independent non-executive director and chairman.

Vendors included Apollo Global Management, Oaktree Capital and Goldman Sachs who took over from CVC in a refinancing deal in October 2012.

In 2014, Nine Entertainment Co. founded online streaming company Stan with Fairfax Media, investing $50 million into the joint venture.

On 16 April 2015, Nine Entertainment Co. announced the sale of its Nine Live business to Affinity Equity Partners for $640 million to reduce debt and fund an ongoing capital management program. In October 2015, the WIN Corporation purchased a 14% stake in Nine Entertainment Co. from investment fund operator Apollo.

Hugh Marks (2015–2020) 
In November 2015, Hugh Marks was appointed as CEO. He replaced David Gyngell, who remained on the board. In February 2016, Peter Costello was appointed chairman.

In March 2016, Nine Entertainment Co purchased a 9.9% stake in Southern Cross Media Group from the Macquarie Group. On 29 April 2016, Nine Entertainment Co. ended a 27-year affiliation agreement with WIN Corporation, instead partnering with Southern Cross Austereo in parts of regional Queensland, New South Wales and Victoria, after securing a 50% revenue sharing deal with Southern Cross, which is higher than its existing 39% deal with WIN. Nine sold its stake in the business in September.

On 26 July 2018, Nine Entertainment Co. and Fairfax Media announced they agreed on terms for a merger between the two companies to become Australia's largest media company. As a result of the merger, Nine shareholders own 51.1 percent of the combined entity and Fairfax shareholders own 48.9 percent. After the merger between Nine Entertainment Co and Fairfax Media in December 2018, WIN Corporation's stake was diluted to 7.76% but later increased to 15.24% in January 2018. In September 2018, it was announced that WIN Corporation's overall economic interest had grown to 25%.

On 25 May 2020, Nine Entertainment sold their New Zealand subsidiary Stuff, which had been acquired during the purchase of Fairfax in December 2018, to Stuff's chief executive Sinead Boucher for NZ$1. The transaction is due to be completed by 31 May and marks the return of Stuff into New Zealand ownership. As part of the agreement, Nine will benefit from all proceeds of the sale of wholesale broadband business Stuff Fibre to telecommunications company Vocus Group, and ownership of Stuff's Wellington printing press.

In November 2020, Hugh Marks resigned from the Nine Network after revealing he was in a relationship with a former colleague. Nine Entertainment relocated from Willoughby, where it had been based for 64 years, to new offices at 1 Denison Street, in North Sydney in December 2020.

Mike Sneesby (2021–present) 
In March 2021, Nine Entertainment announced the appointment of Mike Sneesby as Chief Executive Officer, effective 1 April 2021, following Hugh Marks resignation. On 12 March 2021, Nine announced that it would be returning its regional affiliation back to WIN Television, ending its 5 year affiliation with SCA. As part of the deal, WIN will pay Nine 50% of advertising revenue and provide airtime to Nine's assets across the networks television and radio network. The affiliation switch was reversed on 1 July 2021. Upon the switch, WIN's unique branding was phased out in favour of Nine's metro branding with the WIN branding retained for local idents, promos, community announcements and sponsor billboards. However, WIN News remains under its unique name and format.

It was announced on 15 September 2021, that WIN's advertising department would be merged into Nine's advertising team with Nine's advertising platform 9Galaxy extending into regional areas from July 2022. This will mean advertisers in regional areas can book advertising directly with Nine for the first time instead of booking with WIN.

Assets

Television 
 Nine Network, an Australian commercial free-to-air television primary channel
Sydney, Melbourne, Brisbane, Adelaide, Perth, Darwin, Northern New South Wales and Gold Coast
 9HD is an Australian free-to-air HD digital television multichannel using the primary channel simulcast
 9Gem is an Australian free-to-air digital television multichannel suitable for sport and entertainment
 9Go! is an Australian free-to-air digital television multichannel aimed at 14- to 39-year-olds.
 9Life is an Australian free-to-air digital television multichannel featuring reality and lifestyle programs
 9Rush is an Australian free-to-air digital television multichannel aimed at a 25- to 54-year-old male audience. (joint venture with Warner Bros. Discovery)
 10 Darwin (50% joint venture with Southern Cross Austereo, Network 10 affiliate)
 9Now a video on demand, catch-up TV service which carries the main and multichannels of the Nine Network

Radio

News. Talk. Sport.

Music 
The following stations are run under a lease agreement by Ace Radio.

Digital & Print

News 
 9News.com.au, a news portal
 Australian Financial Review, a newspaper and subscription news website
 Brisbane Times, a subscription news website
 Nine.com.au, a web portal
 The Age, a newspaper and subscription news website
 The Sydney Morning Herald, a newspaper and subscription news website
 WAtoday, a subscription news website

Lifestyle 
 9Entertainment
 9Honey, a women's network
 Australian Financial Review Magazine
 BOSS
 CarAdvice.com, automotive reviews and news
 Drive
 Essential Baby
 Essential Kids
 Executive Style
 Australian Traveller Magazine
 Future Women
 Good Food
 Good Weekend
 Life & Leisure
 Life & Leisure Luxury
 Life & Leisure - Sophisticated Traveller
 Wide World of Sports, online services of Nine's sports brand
 Pedestrian Group (majority stake), a digital media enterprise including the former Allure Media

Other businesses 
 9Saver
 9Voyager, an advertisement buying platform
 Domain Group (59.2%)
 Stan, an Australian online streaming service.

Former assets 
 ACP Magazines, a magazine publisher operating in Australia, New Zealand, Asia and the United Kingdom. Sold to the Bauer Media Group in 2012.
 Australian Community Media, a newspaper publisher. Sold to Antony Catalano and Thorney Investment Group in 2019
 Cudo, a group buying site launched as a joint venture with Microsoft Sold to Deals.com.au in 2013
 Fairfax Events and Entertainment, an events and entertainment company. Sold to Ironman group in 2019
 Find a Babysitter, a babysitter website was sold to its co-founders, Delia Timms and Jeff Bonnes, in 2021.
 RSVP, an online dating service was sold by Nine to its managers David Heysen and Daniel Haigh in 2021.
 Stuff Ltd, a New Zealand publisher and digital company. Sold to Sinead Boucher in May 2020.
 Sydney Super Dome, an entertainment and sporting complex located in Sydney. Sold to Affinity Equity Partners in 2015
 Ticketek, an event ticketing company operating in Australia and New Zealand. Sold to Affinity Equity Partners in 2015.
 Sky News Australia (33%), an Australian 24-hour cable news channel (joint venture with BSkyB and Seven West Media). Sold to News Corp Australia in December 2016.
 Southern Cross Media Group (9.9%), a radio and regional television media company. Divested in 2016.
 Weatherzone (75%), a weather information provider. Sold to DTN in 2019.

References

External links
 

 
2013 initial public offerings
Companies based in Sydney
Companies listed on the Australian Securities Exchange
CVC Capital Partners companies
Mass media companies of Australia
Television broadcasting companies of Australia
Australian companies established in 2006
Mass media companies established in 2006

de:Publishing and Broadcasting#PBL Media